Henri Bossau Boshoff (born 8 February 1992 in Nelspruit, South Africa) is a Zimbabwean rugby union player, currently playing with SuperLiga side Timișoara Saracens. His regular position is loosehead prop.

Career

Pumas

Born and bred in Nelspruit, which falls within the Mpumalanga Rugby Union, Boshoff was selected to represent their  side at various youth levels. As early as primary school level, he was selected in their Under-13 side that played at the Craven Week in 2005. Three years later, he represented them at the Under-16 Grant Khomo Week and in 2010, he played for them in the premier high school rugby union competition in South Africa, the Under-18 Craven Week held in Welkom.

Golden Lions / UJ

After school, he made the move to Johannesburg to join the  academy. He appeared in all fourteen of the s matches during the 2011 Under-19 Provincial Championship, starting twelve of those, and also scored a try in their match against Gauteng rivals . They finished the regular season in second place on the log to qualify for the title play-offs; Boshoff started in both the 32–27 semi-final win against  and the final, where they won the title by beating the s 20–19 in Johannesburg.

Boshoff was included in the  squad for the 2012 Vodacom Cup competition, but failed to make an appearance. In the second half of 2012, he played twice for the  side in the 2012 Under-21 Provincial Championship, as they reached the semi-finals of the competition.

Boshoff had an eventful debut; he took just 34 minutes to score his first senior try (putting them 12–7 up at the time), but also received a yellow card in the second half of the match. He was included in 's squad for the 2013 Varsity Cup, but didn't appear in that competition. For the second season in a row, Boshoff's side was eliminated in the semi-finals, this time losing 41–44 to  after extra time, in Boshoff last appearance in a Golden Lions shirt.

UKZN Impi

In 2014, Boshoff moved joined KwaZulu-Natal university side  for the 2014 Varsity Shield competition. He was their first-choice loosehead prop during the competition, playing in all nine of their matches during the competition. He contributed one try – a first-minute try against  in a Round Four match in Cape Town – and helped them to finish second in the log to qualify for the final. He played in the final, but ended on the losing side, with  winning the match 35–26 to clinch their second consecutive title.

Boland Cavaliers

He was once again included in the  squad for the 2015 Varsity Shield, but he failed to make any appearances, instead making the move to Wellington, Western Cape to join the  prior to the 2015 Vodacom Cup competition. He immediately established himself in the side, starting their first match of the season, a 10–25 defeat to Western Cape rivals  in Caledon.

Kelso

After five appearances for Boland Cavaliers, Boshoff moved to Scotland, where he joined side Kelso.

References

External links

South African rugby union players
Living people
1992 births
People from Mbombela
Rugby union props
Boland Cavaliers players
Golden Lions players
SCM Rugby Timișoara players
Zimbabwe international rugby union players
Rugby union players from Mpumalanga